Ancylosis albicosta is a species of snout moth in the genus Ancylosis. It was described by Otto Staudinger, in 1870. It is found in Romania, Russia, Turkey, Lebanon and Algeria.

The wingspan is about 24 mm.

References

Moths described in 1870
albicosta
Moths of Europe
Moths of Asia
Moths of Africa